ATD may refer to:

Computing and technology
 Anthropomorphic test device, also known as a crash test dummy
 at (command) or @daemon (spelled "atd", lower case), a standard Unix program
 Azimuth tractor drive, a drive system for tugboats

Medicine and science
 1,4,6-Androstatrien-3,17-dione, estrogen inhibitor
 Acute tryptophan depletion
 Anti-thyroid drugs or antithyroid agent

Other uses
 ATD Fourth World
 Against the Day, a Thomas Pynchon novel
 Association for Talent Development
 Attention to Detail, a defunct British video game developer
 the postal code of Attard, Malta